Over to You: Ten Stories of Flyers and Flying is a collection of short stories by Roald Dahl.  It was published in 1946 by Reynal & Hitchcock.

This early collection is a stylistic departure from Dahl's better known stories. For the most part they do not use suspense or twist endings and are instead more slow-paced and reflective.

Over to You contains the following stories:

"An African Story"
"Only This"
"Katina"
"Beware of the Dog"
"They Shall Not Grow Old"
"Someone Like You"
"Death of an Old Old Man"
"Madame Rosette"
"A Piece of Cake"
"Yesterday Was Beautiful"

References

Short story collections by Roald Dahl
1946 short story collections
Aviation books
Short stories about aviation
Reynal & Hitchcock books